Mangelia unifasciata is a species of sea snail, a marine gastropod mollusk in the family Mangeliidae.

Mangelia unifasciata O.G. Costa, 1844 is a synonym of Mangelia vauquelini (B.C.M. Payraudeau, 1826)

Description

The length of the shell varies between 4.5 mm and 7 mm.

The shell is oblong-ovate. The sutures of the spire are rather deep. The shell is longitudinally crossed by bold, sinuous ribs, interstices between the ribs latticed with conspicuous striae. The color of the shell is white, the striae pale brown.

The white shell has a broad brown band above the aperture, reappearing on the spire, and another one at the base of the body whorl. The aperture is narrow. The outer lip runs almost parallel to the columella.

Distribution
This species occurs in European waters off the British Isles and throughout the Mediterranean Sea, especially off Greece, Italy and France.
.

References

 Risso A., 1826–1827 : Histoire naturelle des principales productions de l'Europe Méridionale et particulièrement de celles des environs de Nice et des Alpes Maritimes Paris, Levrault
 Deshayes G. P., 1835 : Mollusques. pp. 81–203, pl. 18–26, in Bory de Saint-Vincent J.B.G.M. (ed.), Expédition scientifique de Morée. Section des Sciences Physiques. Tome III. 1ere Partie. Zoologie. Première Section. Animaux vertébrés, Mollusques et Polypiers. Levrault, Paris 81–203 pl. 18-26 
 Bivona-Bernardi And., 1838: Generi e specie di molluschi descritti dal Barone Antonio Bivona e Bernardi. Lavori postumi pubblicati dal figlio Andrea dottore in medicina con note ed aggiunte ; Giornale di Scienze Lettere e Arti per la Sicilia 61: 211–227
 Philippi R. A., 1844: Enumeratio molluscorum Siciliae cum viventium tum in tellure tertiaria fossilium, quae in itinere suo observavit. Vol. 2 ; Eduard Anton, Halle 
 Leach W. E., 1852: Molluscorum Britanniae Synopsis. A synopsis of the Mollusca of Great Britain arranged according to their natural affinities and anatomical structure; London pp. VIII + 376
 Bucquoy E., Dautzenberg P. & Dollfus G., 1882–1886: Les mollusques marins du Roussillon. Tome Ier. Gastropodes; Paris, J.B. Baillière & fils
 Gofas, S.; Le Renard, J.; Bouchet, P. (2001). Mollusca, in: Costello, M.J. et al. (Ed.) (2001). European register of marine species: a check-list of the marine species in Europe and a bibliography of guides to their identification. Collection Patrimoines Naturels, 50: pp. 180–213
 BODC (2009). Species list from the British Oceanographic Data Centre

External links
  Tucker, J.K. 2004 Catalog of recent and fossil turrids (Mollusca: Gastropoda). Zootaxa 682:1–1295.
 
 MNHN, Paris: Mangelia undulata (syntype)
 MNHN, Paris: Mangelia companyoi

unifasciata
Gastropods described in 1835